Ölziit (Blessed) is a sum (district) of Arkhangai Province in central Mongolia. There is a concrete bridge over the Orkhon River just east of the sum center. In 2009, its population was 3,102.

References 

Populated places in Mongolia
Districts of Arkhangai Province